Oriol Servià i Imbers (born 13 July 1974) is a Spanish racing driver who competes part-time in the IndyCar Series. He raced for Dragon Racing in the 2014–15 Formula E season, and left the series prior to the 2015 Miami ePrix to become managing director for the technical and commercial partnerships of Dragon Racing. Servià holds a degree in mechanical engineering from the Polytechnic University of Catalonia. Since 2018 he also serves as pace car driver at IndyCar races outside the Indianapolis 500.

Racing career

Early career
Born in Pals, Girona, Catalonia, Spain, Servià started his career in go-karts at a local kart track where he stayed until he was 19, before racing in several Formula Three championships.  In 1998, he moved to the Dayton Indy Lights series in America.  In 1999, Servià won the Indy Lights championship over closest rival Casey Mears.  He had no wins that year but five runner-up finishes.

In 2000, Servià joined the PPI Motorsports team in the Champ Car series, as teammate to Cristiano da Matta.  Servià moved on to race for the Sigma Autosport (for 2001), Patrick Racing (from the middle of 2002 to the end of 2003, finishing 6th in the championship that year), and Dale Coyne Racing (in 2004, scoring some of the underfunded team's best ever results) teams. Servià also practiced for the 2002 Indianapolis 500 for Walker Racing and Conquest Racing although he failed to get a car into the field.

2005–2006

After starting the 2005 season for Coyne, Servià moved to the Newman/Haas Racing team after two races to replace injured Bruno Junqueira. On 28 August 2005, Servià picked up his first-ever Champ Car victory at the Molson Indy Montreal at Circuit Gilles Villeneuve in Montreal. The win was controversial, as Timo Glock, gambling on fuel, was forced to pull over and allow Servià to take the lead on the final lap after cutting the final chicane while blocking Servià a second time. Glock had been warned about an earlier unfair attempt. Servià ultimately finished as championship runner-up behind team-mate Sébastien Bourdais. In 2006 he joined PKV Racing, alongside British rookie Katherine Legge, with team co-owner Jimmy Vasser scheduled to do a partial season (although Vasser only drove in the season opener at Long Beach). Servià ended the season 11th in the standings with one podium finish, a third at Cleveland.

2007
Without a ride at the beginning of the 2007 season, Servià replaced the injured Paul Tracy at Forsythe Championship Racing. Despite little time in the new Panoz DP01 chassis, Servià earned a runner-up finish in his debut with the team. He then finished 4th in his second replacement start, which earned him a seat for the rest of the season, as he replaced teammate Mario Domínguez at Forsythe. For the season, Servià scored two podiums and four top-five finishes in 11 starts with Forsythe Racing. At San Jose, Servià earned a third-place finish after leading a race high 42 laps. But on 12 September 2007 it was announced that Forsythe Championship Racing had named Mexican driver David Martinez to drive the No. 7 INDECK Cosworth/DP01/Bridgestone for the final two Champ Car World Series races of the season. Luckily for Servià in October he was named the new pilot of the No. 22 Pay By Touch PKV Racing Cosworth/DP01/Bridgestone entry replacing Tristan Gommendy for these two races, because Gommendy had some unresolved business situation. The veteran driver finished in the top ten in all but one start this season, and despite missing the season opener, finished sixth in the Series standings.

2008

On 3 January 2008 PKV Racing announced that popular Spanish driver Servià, who had finished sixth in the 2007 Champ Car World Series, would return to the series for 2008 with PKV Racing. However, following Champ Car's unification with the IndyCar Series, the team fields cars for Servià and Will Power in the unified IndyCar Series, under the KV Racing name following Dan Pettit's departure.

Servià finished 11th at the Indianapolis 500, impressive due to his 25th place start. He stayed in the top 15 for most of the race. A week later, he had a remarkable run at Milwaukee. After falling back to 26th position and losing a lap early in the race due to contact with Enrique Bernoldi, he immediately regained his lap on the restart and steadily moved through the field to finish 6th. Following unsuccessful races in Iowa and Texas, Servià improved his best finish in an IRL-spec race by finishing 4th in the Detroit Indy Grand Prix. The final race of the season at the Chicagoland Speedway brought in CDW as a new sponsor.

The season finished with Servià racking up seven top-10 finishes, five top-5 finishes, and a 4th-place best finish.

2009

Servià was sidelined for the first three races of the IndyCar Series leading into the Indianapolis 500.  He signed a deal with Rahal Letterman Racing to compete in the Indianapolis 500.  He qualified on the third day of qualifying at an average speed of 220.984, and finished 26th in the race after dropping out with mechanical problems.

He then signed on with Newman/Haas/Lanigan Racing for the Mid-Ohio race after serving as an advisor to Tony Kanaan at Andretti Green Racing.

2011

Due to sponsorship issues at Newman/Haas/Lanigan Racing, Servià sat out the 2010 IndyCar season.  However, after picking up Telemundo and CDW as sponsors, Servià was able to make his return for the 2011 season.  He had his best season since 2005, by finishing with three podiums, six top 5s, and eleven top 10s on his way to finishing 4th in the points.

Servià also finished runner-up in the controversial race at 2011 MoveThatBlock.com Indy 225.  With just 10 laps remaining, the green flag was displayed, which resulted in multiple crashes.  As the race was then red flagged, with Servià in front, race control decided to reverse the order and award Ryan Hunter-Reay as the winner. Newman/Haas Racing and Chip Ganassi Racing filed protests.  After a hearing on 22 August, the race was officially awarded to Andretti Autosport's Ryan Hunter-Reay.

Three weeks later, Servià would score his second runner-up of the season in the Baltimore Grand Prix.

2012

The 2012 Indycar Season saw a change for Servià, as he moved to the Dreyer & Reinbold Racing team.  The season started rough for Servià, due to the use of a Lotus motor that was not competitive compared to the Chevrolet and Honda motors.  At the Indianapolis 500, the team switched to Chevrolet power, and Servià's scored his first top 10 of the season.  He went on to score three more top 5s to finish 13th in points.

2013

Servià began the 2013 Indycar season with the same team as last year, where he scored one top 5 finish at the 2013 São Paulo Indy 300.  However his team ran into sponsorship problems following the 2013 Indianapolis 500.  Servià was later signed to drive the Panther Racing National Guard car for Texas and Iowa.

2015

Servià started the 2015 Indianapolis 500 in the 5th row in 13th place. He was unable to complete the race after a collision with Ed Carpenter and the official results had him in 29th place. After Justin Wilson's fatal crash at the ABC Supply 500, Servià took over his car at Sonoma.

2017
In 2017, Oriol was signed to a three-race deal with Rahal Letterman Lanigan Racing. He raced at the 2017 Indianapolis 500, and the Detroit doubleheader, finishing 21st, 20th, and 19th, respectively.

2019

Servià drove in the 103rd running of the Indy 500 race in May with Team Stange Racing who worked with Schmidt Peterson Motorsport according to their own Instagram-page as well as their website.

Career results

American open–wheel racing results
(key) (Races in bold indicate pole position; races in italics indicate fastest lap)

Indy Lights

CART/Champ Car

 ^ New points system implemented in 2004

IndyCar Series

* Season still in progress.

 1 Run on same day.
 2 Non-points-paying, exhibition race.
 3 The Las Vegas Indy 300 was abandoned after Dan Wheldon died from injuries sustained in a 15-car crash on lap 11.

Indianapolis 500

Complete Formula E results
(key) (Races in bold indicate pole position; races in italics indicate fastest lap)

References

External links

 
IndyCar 36: Oriol Servià – IndyCar documentary

1974 births
Living people
Spanish expatriate sportspeople in the United States
Spanish racing drivers
Catalan racing drivers
Champ Car drivers
Indianapolis 500 drivers
Indy Lights champions
Indy Lights drivers
IndyCar Series drivers
American Le Mans Series drivers
Formula E drivers
Dale Coyne Racing drivers
Newman/Haas Racing drivers
Team Penske drivers
Dragon Racing drivers
KV Racing Technology drivers
Rahal Letterman Lanigan Racing drivers
Dreyer & Reinbold Racing drivers
Andretti Autosport drivers
Arrow McLaren SP drivers
PacWest Racing drivers
Panther Racing drivers
Forsythe Racing drivers
La Filière drivers